Gentlemen Prefer Blondes is a 1928 American silent comedy film directed by Mal St. Clair, co-written by Anita Loos based on her 1925 novel, and released by Paramount Pictures. No copies are known to exist, and it is now considered to be a lost film. The Broadway version Gentlemen Prefer Blondes starring Carol Channing as Lorelei Lee was mounted in 1949. It was remade into the film Gentlemen Prefer Blondes with Jane Russell as Dorothy Shaw and Marilyn Monroe as Lorelei Lee in 1953.

Plot
Blonde Lorelei and her brunette friend Dorothy search for rich husbands.

Cast
Ruth Taylor as Lorelei Lee
Alice White as Dorothy Shaw
Ford Sterling as Gus Eisman
Holmes Herbert as Henry Spoffard
Mack Swain as Sir Francis Beekman
Emily Fitzroy as Lady Beekman
Trixie Friganza as Mrs. Spoffard
Blanche Friderici as Miss Chapman
Edward Faust as Robert
Eugene Borden as Louis
Margaret Seddon as Lorelei's Mother
Luke Cosgrove as Lorelei's Grandfather
Chester Conklin as Judge
Yorke Sherwood as Mr. Jennings
Mildred Boyd as Lulu

See also
List of lost films

References

External links

Gentlemen Prefer Blondes at Virtual History
Period advertisement poster for the film
Stills and lobby cards at silenthollywood.com

1928 films
American silent feature films
Lost American films
Films directed by Malcolm St. Clair
Films with screenplays by Anita Loos
Films with screenplays by Herman J. Mankiewicz
Films based on American novels
1928 comedy films
Silent American comedy films
American black-and-white films
1928 lost films
Lost comedy films
Paramount Pictures films
1920s American films
1920s English-language films